Qarahəsənli (also, Karagasanli and Karagasanly) is a village and municipality in the Agstafa Rayon of Azerbaijan.  It has a population of 1,267.  The municipality consists of the villages of Qarahəsənli and Mollacəfərli.

References 

Populated places in Aghstafa District